Matej Mavrič Rožič (born 29 January 1979 in Koper) is a retired Slovenian international footballer.

Club career
His former clubs include Piran, Primorje and Gorica (all Slovenian clubs).
In 2005, he won the Norwegian Cup Final for Molde FK, but he was loaned to German 2. Bundesliga club TuS Koblenz in January 2007. In July 2007, TuS Koblenz made his loan permanent. The defender left TuS Koblenz on 31 May 2010 and signed a three-year contract with Austrian club Kapfenberger SV.

Honours
Primorje
Slovenian Cup: Runner-up 1997–98

Gorica
Slovenian Championship: 2003–04; Runner-up: 1999–2000
Slovenian Cup: 2000–01, 2001–02

Molde
Norwegian Football Cup: 2005

See also
Slovenian international players

References

External links
Player profile at NZS 
National team profile 

1979 births
Living people
Sportspeople from Koper
Slovenian footballers
Association football defenders
Slovenian PrvaLiga players
NK Primorje players
ND Gorica players
Slovenian expatriate footballers
Expatriate footballers in Norway
Slovenian expatriate sportspeople in Norway
Eliteserien players
Molde FK players
Expatriate footballers in Austria
Expatriate footballers in Germany
Slovenian expatriate sportspeople in Austria
Slovenian expatriate sportspeople in Germany
2. Bundesliga players
TuS Koblenz players
FC Koper players
Slovenia under-21 international footballers
2010 FIFA World Cup players
Slovenia international footballers
Slovenia youth international footballers